Alevtina Biktimirova (born September 10, 1982) is a Russian long-distance runner, who specialises in the marathon.

Biography
Alevtina placed first in the women's division in the Eurocity Frankfurt Marathon in October 2005. She finished sixth in the 2006 Boston Marathon and was the youngest person in the elite field. She also finished sixth in the 2006 European Athletics Championships that year in Gothenburg.

Alevtina finished second in the 2008 Boston Marathon with a time of 2:25:27, and second in the 2008 Chicago Marathon with a time of 2:29:32. She finished ninth in the 2009 World Championships in Athletics. She won the Tokyo Marathon at the start of the 2010 season.

Achievements

References

External links

Profile

Bikitimirova, Alevtina
Russian female long-distance runners
Russian female marathon runners
Bikitimirova, Alevtina
Frankfurt Marathon female winners
Tokyo Marathon female winners